Albert Gary Pickering (born 22 June 1967) is an English football manager and former professional footballer.

As a player, he played as a defender from 1989 until 2003 notably in the Premier League for Coventry City. He has also played in the Football League for Rotherham United, Stoke City, Burnley, Chesterfield and Chester City, as well as spells in Non-League football for Altrincham, Hyde United, Gainsborough Trinity and Mossley.

In 2001 he took charge of Mossley in a player/manager role and then went on to have spells in charge of Woodley Sports and New Mills before joining Hyde as their reserve team manager.

Playing career
Pickering was born in Manchester and began his career with non-league Buxton before becoming a professional with Rotherham United. He spent five seasons at Millmoor making 111 appearances scoring twice helping the side gain promotion in 1991–92. He earned a move to Premier League side Coventry City in October 1993 and was a regular for two seasons at Highfield Road making 75 appearances. He joined Stoke City in August 1996 and became the regular right back for the Potters making 45 appearances in 1996–97. In 1997–98 he was an ever-present playing in all of the club's 48 fixtures as Stoke suffered relegation. Pickering did score his only goal for Stoke in a 2–1 victory over Portsmouth on 11 April 1998. New Stoke manager Brian Little deemed him to surplus to requirements at the start of the 1998–99 campaign and he joined Burnley.

After a season at Turf Moor Pickering went on to play for Altrincham, Chesterfield and made seven appearances for Chester City. He then dropped into non-league football with Hyde United, Gainsborough Trinity and Mossley.

Managerial career
From November 2001 to July 2003 Pickering was the manager of Mossley. A month after leaving he became assistant manager of Woodley Sports, becoming their manager in 2005. He left in February 2007.

He began a second spell as manager of Woodley Sports in May 2008 but left for a second time in December 2008. On 24 March 2010, Pickering took over as manager at New Mills, initially as caretaker until the end of the season.

Pickering remained at New Mills until October 2012, when he and the club parted company by mutual consent.

In September 2013, Pickering joined Hyde as their reserve team manager.

Career statistics
Source:

A.  The "Other" column constitutes appearances and goals in the Football League Trophy.

References

External links
 
 Burnley career stats

1967 births
Living people
English footballers
Buxton F.C. players
Rotherham United F.C. players
Coventry City F.C. players
Stoke City F.C. players
Burnley F.C. players
Altrincham F.C. players
Chesterfield F.C. players
Chester City F.C. players
Hyde United F.C. players
Gainsborough Trinity F.C. players
Mossley A.F.C. players
Mossley A.F.C. managers
Premier League players
English football managers
Footballers from Manchester
English Football League players
National League (English football) players
Association football defenders